Robert William Muench (born December 28, 1942) is an American prelate of the Roman Catholic Church. Muench served as bishop of the Diocese of Baton Rouge in Louisiana from 2002 to 2018. He previously served as bishop of the Diocese of Covington in Kentucky from 1996 to 2002 and as an auxiliary bishop of the Archdiocese of New Orleans in Louisiana from 1990 to 1996.

Biography

Early life 
Robert Muench was born on December 28, 1942, in Louisville, Kentucky, to William Anthony and Mary Kathryn (née Allgeier) Muench; he has three sisters, Jo Ann, Mary Alice, and Marsha. When he was age three, the family moved to New Orleans, Louisiana. Muench attended Jefferson Davis and St. Leo the Great primary schools in New Orleans.

In 1956, Muench entered Saint Joseph Seminary in Saint Benedict, Louisiana. He graduated from the high school and junior college program in 1962.  He graduated from Notre Dame Seminary in New Orleans in 1964, earning a Bachelor of Philosophy degree

From 1964 to 1968, Muench studied at the Catholic University of America in Washington, D.C., earning a Master of Education degree and completing his seminary studies. He also attended courses at Loyola University New Orleans and the University of New Orleans.

Priesthood 
On May 18, 1968, Muench was ordained to the priesthood by Archbishop Philip Hannan for the Archdiocese of New Orleans.  After his ordination, Muench joined the faculty of St. John Vianney Preparatory School in New Orleans He worked there until 1977, serving as religion teacher, liturgy director, guidance counselor, and eventually rector.  Muench also assisted at various parishes in New Orleans. In 1976, he became associate pastor of St. Matthias Parish in New Orleans, later becoming pastor.

In 1977, Muench also became the vicar for Christian formation, but was moved in 1981 to director of vocations.  In 1983, he was named director of the Pope John XXIII House for Vocation Discernment and executive assistant to Archbishop Hannan. After being named by the Vatican as an honorary prelate of his holiness in 1985, Muench was named by the archbishop as vicar general (1989) and moderator of the curia (1990) for the archdiocese.

Auxiliary Bishop of New Orleans 
On May 8, 1990, Pope John Paul II appointed Muench as an auxiliary bishop of the Diocese of New Orleans and titular bishop of Mactaris. He was consecrated  on June 29, 1990, at Saint Louis, Cathedral in New Orleans by Archbishop Francis Schulte, with Hannan and then Bishop John Favalora serving as co-consecrators. Muench selected as his episcopal motto, "Jesus Must Increase" John 3:30.

Bishop of Covington
On January 5, 1996, John Paul II appointed Muench as the ninth bishop of the Diocese of Covington.  He was installed on March 19, 1995, at the Cathedral Basilica of the Assumption in Covington, Kentucky.

Muench served as a board member of St. Elizabeth Medical Center in Northern Kentucky, chancellor of Thomas More College in Crestview Hills, Kentucky, and a member of the Committee on Priestly Formation within the United States Conference of Catholic Bishops (USCCB).  He also initiated renovations of the Cathedral Basilica of the Assumption

Bishop of Baton Rouge
On December 15, 2001, John Paul II appointed Muench as the fifth bishop of the Diocese of Baton Rouge . He was installed at St. Joseph Cathedral in Baton Rouge on March 14, 2002, with Archbishop Alfred Hughes presiding. Muench also served on the board of trustees of Notre Dame Seminary in New Orleans and Saint Joseph Seminary College.

On November 12, 2004, the Diocese of Baton Rouge settled a sexual abuse lawsuit brought by a Baton Rouge man.  The plaintiff claimed that the late Bishop Joseph Sullivan had abused him when the man was 17 years old in 1975.  Muench authorized the settlement, calling the accusations credible.  He promised to rename the Bishop Sullivan High School before the next school term. Following Hurricane Katrina in 2005, Muench joined Hughes and Louisiana Governor Kathleen Blanco in a televised appearance declaring a day of prayer for the state of Louisiana.

On June 26, 2018, Pope Francis accepted Muench's letter of resignation as bishop of the Diocese of Baton Rouge after Muench reached the mandatory retirement age of 75.

See also
 

 Catholic Church hierarchy
 Catholic Church in the United States
 Historical list of the Catholic bishops of the United States
 List of Catholic bishops of the United States
 Lists of patriarchs, archbishops, and bishops

References

External links

Roman Catholic Diocese of Baton Rouge Official Site

Episcopal succession

1942 births
Living people
Brother Martin High School alumni
Loyola University New Orleans alumni
Notre Dame Seminary alumni
Religious leaders from Louisville, Kentucky
Catholic Church in Louisiana
Roman Catholic Diocese of Baton Rouge
Roman Catholic bishops of Covington
Catholic University of America alumni